Visor i närheten (English: Nearby songs) is an album by the Swedish folk singer-songwriter and guitar player Fred Åkerström. This album includes Åkerström´s interpretations of Fritz Sjöström, Swedish folk composer, singer and artist.

Track listing
 Vindstilla vals
 Närbild
 Ögon
 Hjärtslag
 Olycklig kärlek
 Monolog om julstjärnor
 Barnmålning
 Porträtt av en majstång
 Rus
 Närhet
 Du där i jord
 Brudbrödsbukett

External links
 Lyrics

1965 albums
Swedish-language albums
Fred Åkerström albums